Lübeck (F224) was a  which served in the Bundesmarine from 1963 through 1988.

Design 

The Type 120 or Köln-class frigates were built as smooth-deckers and had very elegant lines. The very diagonally cut bow and the knuckle ribs in the foredeck made it easy to navigate. The hull and parts of the superstructure were made of shipbuilding steel, other superstructure parts were made of aluminum. Due to the installation of gas turbines, large side air inlets were necessary, which could be closed by lamellas. The stern was designed as a round stern. The large funnel was sloped and skirted. Behind the bridge superstructure stood the tall lattice mast with radar and other antennas. The hull was divided into 13 watertight compartments.

On the forecastle was a 10 cm gun, behind it, set higher, a 4 cm twin gun. Behind it stood two quadruple anti-submarine missile launchers 37.5 cm from Bofors. A 4 cm Bofors single gun on each side of the aft superstructure and another 4 cm double mount at the end of the superstructure. There was a second 10 cm gun on the quarterdeck. In addition, there were two 53.3 cm torpedo tubes behind the front superstructures. They were used to fire Mk-44 torpedoes. Mine rails were laid behind the torpedo tubes and ran to the stern.

Construction and career 

Lübeck was built by Stülcken & Sohn, Hamburg. She was laid down on 28 October 1959, launched on 23 July 1960, and was commissioned on 6 June 1963.

After 25 years of service, Lübeck was taken out of active service on 30 September 1988 and sold to Turkey. On 14 November, she set sail for Gölcük, Kocaeli, Turkey with skeleton crew of 140 personnel. She was formally decommissioned on 1 December 1988 and handed over to the Turkish Naval Forces. Turkish navy used her as spare parts source for other  in Turkish service.

Notes

References 

Gardiner, Robert and Stephen Chumbley. Conway's All The World's Fighting Ships 1947–1995. Annapolis, Maryland, USA: Naval Institute Press, 1995. .
Prézelin, Bernard and A.D. Baker III. The Naval Institute Guide to Combat Fleets of the World 1990/1991. Annapolis, Maryland, USA: Naval Institute Press, 1990. .

See also 
 List of frigates
 List of German Federal Navy ships
 List of naval ships of Germany

Köln-class frigates
1963 ships
Ships built in Hamburg